Lisa C. Ravensbergen is a multi-disciplinary artist and writer of Ojibwe/Swampy Cree and English/Irish descent, based in Vancouver, British Columbia. Ravensbergen is a Jessie-nominated actor, dramaturge, director and dancer. Ravensbergen is an Associate Artist with Full Circle First Nations Performance Group and Playwright-in-Residence with Delinquent Theatre. She holds undergraduate degrees from Trinity Western University and Simon Fraser University and an MA in Cultural Studies from Queens University.

Theatre career
In 2019, Ravensbergen wrote a play titled The Seventh Fire produced by Delinquent Theatre and in association with the Neworld Theatre company. The Seventh Fire looks at sourcing traditional, oral Anishinaabe stories and societal roles as a way to explore ceremony in the everyday. Set in the present, past, and future, it tells the story of a woman's return to the Ojibwe community she believes has rejected her. In 2018, she was featured in an experimental performance titled Hearing, finding, translating Kiyoko by Julie Tamiko Manning at the Tableau D'Hôte Theatre in Montreal, QC as well as the Powell Street Festival in Vancouver, BC. In March 1018, she directed a play titled Daughter Cafe, which took place at the Belfry Theatre, in Victoria, BC. In 2017, she worked as dramaturge for the play titled In the Shadow of the Mountains by Valerie Sing Turner, which took place at Studio 1398, Festival House, in Vancouver, BC. In 2009, she performed in the Western Canadian Theatre's production of The Ecstasy of Rita Joe, playing the name character Rita Joe.

Artistic career 
In June 2001, Ravensbergen co-curated the show Taking Stick Cabaret with Daina Warren at Grunt Gallery, in Vancouver, BC. In September 2020, Ravensbergen was featured in Soundings: An Exhibition in Five Parts curated by Candice Hopkins and Dylan Robinson which exhibited at The Gund Gallery at Kenyon College in Gambier, Ohio, Agnes Etherington Art Centre, Kingston, ON, the Kitchener-Waterloo Art Gallery, Kitchener-Waterloo, the Morris and Helen Belkin Art Gallery, Vancouver, BC and Kamloops Art Gallery, Kamloops, BC. In February 2021, Ravensbergen participated in an online group exhibition project titled PushOFF 2021: Speculative Futures in collaboration with Theatre Company and Company 605.

Co-Authored Publications 

 Marshall, Mariel and Lisa Cooke Ravensbergen. "The Doing that can Undo: Decolonizing the Performer-Audience Relationship in Lisa Cooke Ravensbergen's Citation." Canadian Theatre Review 179, (2019): 80–82.
 Robinson, Dylan, Kanonhsyonne Janice C. Hill, Armand Garnet Ruffo, Selena Couture, and Lisa Cooke Ravensbergen. "Rethinking the Practice and Performance of Indigenous Land Acknowledgement." Canadian Theatre Review 177, (2019): 20–30.

Further reading 

 Hopkins, Candace, Dylan Robinson, and Agnes Etherington Art Centre. Soundings: An Exhibition in Five Parts. Kingston, Ontario: Agnes Etherington Art Centre, Queen's University, 2019.
 Fitzsimmons Frey, Heather M. "We are all Treaty People: Indigenous-Settler Relations, Story and Young Audiences." Theatre Research International 45, no. 1 (2020): 37–54.
 Ravensbergen, Léa, Ron Buliung, and Nicole Laliberté. "Toward Feminist Geographies of Cycling." Geography Compass 13, no. 7 (2019)
 Nolan, Yvette. "Dramaturging the Process." Canadian Theatre Review 135, no. 135 (2008): 73-75
 Martin, Keith, Dylan Robinson, and David Garneau Arts of Engagement: Taking Aesthetic Action in and Beyond the Truth and Reconciliation Commission of Canada. Waterloo, Ontario: Wilfrid Laurier University Press, 2016.

Filmography

References

Living people
Artists from Vancouver
Trinity Western University alumni
Simon Fraser University alumni
Writers from Vancouver
Year of birth missing (living people)